Caribbean Romance is a 1943 American romance film directed by Lester Fuller. The film stars Eric Blore, Olga San Juan, Mabel Paige, Jimmy Lydon, Alice Kirby, Marie McDonald, George M. Carleton and José Barroso. The film was released on December 17, 1943, by Paramount Pictures.

Plot

Cast 
Eric Blore as Captain
Olga San Juan as Linda
Mabel Paige as Linda's aunt
Jimmy Lydon as Peter Conway
Alice Kirby as Passenger
Marie McDonald as Passenger
George M. Carleton as Linda's Uncle
José Barroso as Orchestra Leader

References

External links 
 

1943 films
American romantic comedy films
Paramount Pictures films
1943 romantic comedy films
1940s English-language films
1940s American films